Donne assassine is an Italian crime-drama television series.

Cast
Ana Caterina Morariu: Lisa
Claudia Pandolfi: Manuela
Sandra Ceccarelli: Chiara
Marina Suma: Laura
Martina Stella: Patrizia
Caterina Murino: Anna Maria
Valentina Cervi: Margherita
Violante Placido: Marta 
Sabrina Impacciatore: Veronica
Donatella Finocchiaro: Marta 
Giorgio Colangeli:  Padre Ignazio
Giuseppe Battiston

See also
List of Italian television series

External links
 

Italian television series
2008 Italian television series debuts
2008 Italian television series endings